() was a Byzantine technical term, meaning deputy or lieutenant. As such, it was used in different ways throughout the Empire's history. The  was usually placed in command of one half of the respective unit. In the early 12th century,  are found as commanders of small regions and fortresses, while in the late Palaiologan period, the term was used for representatives of the Patriarch of Constantinople in sees that now lay outside the Byzantine Empire's borders.

References

Greek words and phrases
Byzantine military offices
Byzantine administrative offices